Khagendra Bahadur Basnyat (1929–1977) was a Nepalese social activist.

He was born in 1929 in Dillibazar, Kathmandu, Nepal. He was diagnosed with a rare hip disease that "confined him to bed for the rest of his life".

Basnyat founded various organisations including the Nepal Blind and Disabled Association, and Disabled Society of Nepal to help disabled people in Nepal. He died in 1977.

References

Further reading 

 

1929 births
1977 deaths
Nepalese activists
People from Kathmandu
Nepalese social workers
Nepalese people with disabilities